Golovinka is a small khutor - a rural locality - in southwest Russia near the border with Ukraine. It is a farming community in the Sovetinskogo rural settlement, in Neklinovsky District of Rostov Oblast. The population is 132 as of the year 2010.

Golovinka hosts Russian Army soldiers as part of the 2014–15 Russian military intervention in Ukraine.

Geography

References

Rural localities in Rostov Oblast